John Antrobus (1806 – 26 July 1878) was an English clergyman and cricketer who played for Cambridge University in 1826.

Antrobus was born in Acton, the son of Rev. William Antrobus, rector of Acton. He was educated at Eton where he played twice in the Eton-Harrow match, and then went to St John's College, Cambridge. He was also renowned as the 'Champion Skater' of his day.

Antrobus made two first-class appearances, separated by six years. His first match, in 1826, was for Cambridge University against Cambridge Town Club. Batting as an opener, Antrobus had an indifferent debut match, scoring six runs in the first innings as batting partner Charles Chapman scored 47 not out, carrying his bat throughout the order, as only one more batsman made a double-figures total.

Antrobus' second and final first-class fixture came in 1832 in a match for Lord Strathavon's XI against Sir St Vincent Cotton's XI, in which he scored a duck in the first innings and was absent hurt in the second.

Antrobus was ordained deacon (London) on 25 May 1834 and priest on 14 June 1835. He was curate to his father at St Andrew Undershaft, London, from 1841 to 1853. He was a Minor Canon of Westminster from 1856 to 1878 and Chaplain-in-Ordinary to the Queen from 1869 to 1878. 
 
Antrobus died in Westminster aged 72.

Publications
Parental Wisdom
The Wrongs of Poland – a Poem in three Cantos
The Czar and the Turk
Elijah in the Desert

References

1806 births
1878 deaths
English cricketers
Cambridge University cricketers
People from Acton, London
People educated at Eton College
Alumni of St John's College, Cambridge
Lord Strathavon's XI cricketers